Abu Al-Qasim Al-Ansari (1040 - 1118) was a Persian jurist and an theologian during the Islamic Golden Age. He was a student of the "Imam of the Two Holy Mosques" Al-Juwayni, and was referred to as Saif al-Nazr. As a Muslim scholar of the Sunni branch and Shafi'i school, his studies covered the fields of Islamic theology, Twelver theology, Sufism, Interpretation of Quran, and the studies of Hadith. Among his most prominent students were Al-Shahrastani, the author of Al-Milal wa al-Nihal (lit. "The Book of Sects and Creeds"); and Ḍiyāʾ al-Dīn al-Makkī, father of Fakhr al-Din al-Razi. He lived under the Abbasid Caliphate, between the second half of the fifth century AH and beginning of the sixth century AH of the Islamic calendar.

Biography 
Al-Ansari's full name was "Salman bin Nasser bin Imran bin Muhammad bin Ismail bin Ishaq bin Yazid bin Ziyad bin Maymoon bin Mahran, Abu al-Qasim, Ansari al-Nisaburi". Some of those who translated Al-Ansari disagreed with this designation, instead used “Suleiman” in the place of “Salman”. Perhaps this is due to a misrepresentation in the copies of the books in which it was mentioned that he was named after Solomon. Due to the large number of people who called him "Salman" from those who translated for him, as well as the closeness of the two names in form, the two names were mixed up during the translation. There is an anecdote that confirms his name to be Salman from records of Ibn Qadi Shahba, in which it was mentioned that al-Ansari personally corrected his name in the sentence: "Salman opened the Seine".

Al-Ansari grew up in a town on the outskirts of Nishapur of Transoxiana, which is located in the northeastern part of modern-day Iran. At the time the area was under the control of the Seljuk Empire. In his early age, Al-Ansari spent time under the apprenticeship to Fadlallah Al-Mehani, the then Sheikh of Khorasan. Al-Ansari was among those whom he narrated the hadith to on the authority of Zaher bin Ahmed Al-Sarkhasi.

Around 465 AH (1073 CE), Al-Ansari became a disciple of the Sufi scholar Al-Qushayri. After completing his studies under Al-Qushayri, he moved to Levant, and visited the graves of the prophets. He kept an ascetic and pious lifestyle during his travels and studies. Al-Ansari also spent time serving and learning from the following scholars:
 Abu al-Hasan ibn Makki, whom Al-Ansari came across in Damascus and learned hadith narration from;
 Abd al-Ghafir al-Farsi, a linguist, imam and a complier of Nishapur history;
 Karima al-Marwaziyya, the author of the narration on the authority of Muhammad al-Bukhari;
 Al-Juwayni, a Persian Islamic theologian and Imam al Haramayn (lit "leading master of the two holy cities"). He lectured Al-Ansari on discourse. Later Al-Ansari quoted extensively from Al-Juwayni.
Around the last few years of his life, Al-Ansari suffered from poor eyesight and tinnitus. The majority of those who translated for him agreed that his death was in the year 512 AH (1118 CE). Some of the sources specified that he died in the month of Jumada al-Akhir (the 6th month of Islamic calendar). In contrary, a number of accounts, such as the ones made by Al-Dhahabi, Al-Suyuti and Ahmed bin Muhammad al-Adnroy claimed that Al-Ansari died in the year 511 AH (1117 CE) instead.

His studies 
Al-Ansari had complied materials from several imams concerning the Twelver theology. In his work Alghaniat fi Alkalam and Al-Ghaniyaa Dariyyah, he also weighted the authenticity of many hadiths, including the ones on:
 Inference to the world event;
 The eternity of divine attributes;
 The invalidity of the sayings of Al-Dahriya, who said that the world was old;
 Prohibition of contemplating Allah and commanding comtemplation of his creatures;
 Prohibition of saying that Allah is equal with other deities.

Out of the hadiths that Al-Ansari examined in the theology section of his book Al-Ghaniyaa Dariyyah, he determined that 88 hadiths can be attributed to the prophet Muhammad, and 44 were sayings from the companions and followers of the prophet.

His pupils 
Some of the most notable individuals among his students were:
 Al-Shahrastani, the author of Nihāyat al-aqdām fī 'ilm al-kalām (The End of Steps in the Science of Theology) and Kitāb al–Milal wa al-Nihal (The Book of Sects and Creeds);
 Diaa al-Din Abu al-Qasim al-Razi, a poet and author of Ghayat al-Maram;
 Abu Al-Fath Al-Ansari Al-Nisaburi, Al-Ansari's own son and a diplomat under the Sultan Ahmad Sanjar;
 Ibn al-Sam'ani, a Islamic historian.

Works 
 Alghaniat fi Alkalam
 Sharh al-Irshad
 Sharh Alghaniat fi Furue AlShaafieiat Liabn Sirij, which was atrributed to Al-Ansari by Ḥājjī Khalīfa in Kashf al-Zunun
 Kitab Altaharat fi Alfiqh
 Kitab Aldahaya
 Kitab fi Altafsir

References 

1040 births
Asharis
Shafi'i fiqh scholars
1118 deaths